Hemiancistrus cerrado is a species of catfish in the family Loricariidae. It is native to South America, where it occurs in the Araguaia River basin in the Tocantins River drainage in Brazil. It is usually found in rocky riffles in second-order streams. The species reaches 17 cm (6.7 inches) SL and is named for the Cerrado, the ecoregion in which it occurs.

References 

Ancistrini
Fish of the Tocantins River basin
Fish described in 2008